Higsons may refer to:

 The Higsons, an English funk-punk band active during the 1980s
 Higsons Brewery, a Liverpool brewery founded in 1780